Gnosis is the eighth studio album by American instrumental rock band Russian Circles. It was released on August 19, 2022 through Sargent House.

Track listing

Personnel 
Russian Circles
 Brian Cook – bass
 Mike Sullivan – guitar
 Dave Turncrantz – drums

Charts

References 

2022 albums
Russian Circles albums
Sargent House albums
Albums produced by Kurt Ballou